Basirhat district is a proposed border district of West Bengal state. Basirhat subdivision of North 24 Parganas district will be formed separately in Basirhat district. The main river of basirhat district is Ichamati river. The headquarters of this district is Basirhat. There are three municipalities in the district: Basirhat, Baduria and Taki. Being a police and health district already, the proposed district may be renamed.

History
On 1 August 2022, Chief Minister of West Bengal Mamata Banerjee declared the creation of a new district consisting of Basirhat subdivision craving out from North 24 Parganas district.

Area
Apart from the municipalities of Basirhat, Baduria and Taki, the district contains one census town and rural areas of 90 gram panchayats under ten community development blocks: Baduria, Basirhat–I, Basirhat–II, Haroa, Hasnabad, Hingalganj, Minakhan, Sandeshkhali–I and Sandeshkhali–II and Swarupnagar. The only census town is: Dhanyakuria. 
According to a proposal that was brought by the government of West Bengal, Basirhat district is supposed to be composed of two sub-divisions. The two subdivisions were to be headquartered at Basirhat and Minakhan. The Basirhat subdivision would comprise six CD blocks, namely Basirhat–I, Basirhat–II, Hasnabad, Hingalganj, Baduria and Swarupnagar. The Minakhan subdivision would consist of four CD blocks - Minakhan, Sandeshkhali–I, Sandeshkhali–II and Haroa

References

Proposed districts of West Bengal